Happy Birthday is the ninth album by popular children's entertainers Sharon, Lois & Bram, originally released in 1988. The album was released in honor of Sharon, Lois & Bram's 10th Anniversary, hence the "birthday" theme.

Releases
The original title was "Happy Birthday" for the first editions published under Elephant Records & A&M Records. They are available on CD, Cassette, and Record. This was the last album of Sharon, Lois & Bram's to be available on record.

In 1996, Elephant Record re-released the album under the title "Elephant Party". The cover had a white background and featured a cartoon Elephant bursting out of a birthday present with two shots of Sharon, Lois & Bram jumping in surprise. This edition added the song "Ha-Ha, This-A-Way", but didn't have "Puff the Magic Dragon".

Then again in 1996, Drive Entertainment released the album in the United States under the title "Elephant Party" as well, but the cover was changed to a yellow background featuring Sharon, Lois & Bram and Elephant surrounded by balloons. It came with a pin-the-tail on the elephant game and a fold-out with lyrics to most of the songs. This edition also cut out several songs from the original recording.

At one point, there was to be a re-release of Happy Birthday titled "The Elephant Party" featuring the same album jacket as the Happy Birthday recording, but for some reason the idea didn't get past the planning stages.
 
1988 (Elephant Records) LP Record/Cassette/CD
1990 (A&M Records) LP Record/Cassette/CD
1996 (Elephant Records) Cassette/CD
1996 (Drive Entertainment) Cassette/CD

Television
The making of the Happy Birthday recording was featured on the episode "Making A Record" from Season 5 of Sharon, Lois & Bram's Elephant Show. The 30-minute show showed how an album is put together, from start to finish. The episode featured several songs from the recording as well as some old favorites for Sharon, Lois & Bram's "10 Years Singing" Anniversary.

Nominations & Awards

American Library Association Award, Notable Children's Recording (1988)
Parent's Choice Award, Classic Audio (1993)

Track listing
""Happy Birthday To You"
"Happy Birthday Jig 1"
"We're All Together Again"
"If I Knew You Were Coming I'd've Baked A Cake"
"Fish & Chips & Vinegar"
"Jock-A-Mo"*
"Being Five"*
"I'm Five"
"Turn Around"
"Simple Gifts"
"I Had An Old Coat"
"Boomps-A-Daisy"
"You're the Same As I Am"
"Charoumena Genethlia"
"Sto Lat"
"Tsu Dayn Geburtstog"
"Petit Papa"
"Las Mañanitas"
"Apples, Peaches, Pears & Plums"
"The Unbirthday Song"
"Happy Birthday Jig 2"
"Happy Birthday Jig 3"
"Walk Right In"
"One, One Cinnamon Bun"*
"Everybody Eats When They Come to My House"
"When I Was One"*
"Going Over the Sea"
"Puff, the Magic Dragon"**
"Roses Red"
"Birthday Hallelujah"*
"Sarah the Whale"
"Farmer in the Dell"
"When You Wish Upon A Star"
"String Quartet"
"Happy Birthday Waltz"
"Happy Birthday Jig 4"

(*) Not Featured on "Elephant Party" (Drive Entertainment 1996)
(**) Not Featured on "Elephant Party" (Elephant Records 1996)

1988 albums
Sharon, Lois & Bram albums